Warts and All is an album series of live recorded shows by the American jam band Moe

As of mid-2007, there are six volumes.

Warts and All series
Volume 1: Recorded live on February 28, 2001 at the Scranton Cultural Center in Scranton, Pennsylvania.
Volume 2: Recorded live on February 23, 2002 at The Tabernacle in Atlanta, Georgia.
Volume 3: Recorded live on November 13, 1998 at the Vic Theater in Chicago, Illinois.
Volume 4: Recorded live on July 18, 1998 at the Copper Dragon in Carbondale, Illinois.
Volume 5: Recorded live on February 22, 2005 at the Val Air Ballroom in Des Moines, Iowa.
Volume 6: Recorded live on January 28, 2007 at Liberty Hall in Lawrence, Kansas.

Live album series
Moe (band) live albums
2000s live albums